Thomas Chatelle (born 31 March 1981 in Jette, Brussels) is a retired Belgian footballer, who last played for Mons. He normally played as a winger and has gained 3 caps for the Belgium national team.

His former clubs include Racing Genk, AA Gent, KV Mechelen, Anderlecht, Sint-Truiden and the Dutch club N.E.C. Thomas has two daughters.

Club career

Anderlecht
In January 2008, the former Racing Genk captain was sold to Anderlecht. At the start of the 2009-10 season, he scored a goal in the Champions League Third Round Qualifying against Turkish side Sivasspor.

On 29 January 2012, Chatelle left Anderlecht join to Sint-Truiden on loan. After the loan spell ended, he was released by Anderlecht when his contract ended and stayed without a club from the end of the 2011-12 season until November 2012, when Mons signed him as a free player to replace the injured Tim Matthys.

References

External links
 
 
 

1981 births
Living people
People from Jette
Belgian footballers
Belgium international footballers
Belgium youth international footballers
Belgium under-21 international footballers
Belgian expatriate footballers
K.A.A. Gent players
K.V. Mechelen players
K.R.C. Genk players
R.S.C. Anderlecht players
Sint-Truidense V.V. players
R.A.E.C. Mons players
Belgian Pro League players
NEC Nijmegen players
Eredivisie players
Expatriate footballers in the Netherlands
Association football midfielders
Footballers from Brussels